David Oliver Cohen (born June 9, 1980) is an American writer, actor and entrepreneur based in New York City. He is one of the authors of the White Girl Problems book series, and a founder of Swish Beverages.

Early life and education
Cohen grew up in Annapolis, Maryland. He attended New York University, where he studied acting. He is Jewish

Career

Writing
In 2010, Cohen, his brother Tanner Cohen and Lara Schoenhals created a Twitter account called White Girl Problems, writing under the pseudonym Babe Walker, a fictional 20-something socialite. They signed a deal to turn the Twitter feed into a book series, with the first novel, White Girl Problems, published in 2012 under the pen name Babe Walker. It became a New York Times best-seller the following month. The follow-up, Psychos, was published in 2014, and American Babe, the final novel in the trilogy, was published in 2016. The film rights to White Girl Problems were purchased by Lionsgate in 2013. In 2016, it was announced that the film was in development, to be directed by Lauren Palmigiano and produced by Elizabeth Banks and Max Handelman, and to star Danielle Macdonald.

Under the pseudonym Taylor Bell, a fictional college freshman, Cohen and his brother co-wrote the 2015 novel Dirty Rush. In 2015, it was announced that TriStar had purchased the rights to Dirty Rush, with the film to be produced by Banks and Handelman.

Credited to The Fat Jew, the 2015 book Money Pizza Respect was written by Josh Ostrovsky and Cohen, as a collection of comedic personal essays based on Ostrovsky's life.

Acting
Cohen starred as Daniel McDaniel on the Nickelodeon show Taina for two years, starting in 2001. Following that, he performed as the lead, narrator and filmmaker Mark Cohen, in the national tour of the musical Rent. From 2006 to 2007, he portrayed Kip Lonegan on the CBS soap opera As the World Turns.

Film
Cohen produced the documentary Sex Positive, which profiles safe sex activist Richard Berkowitz and premiered at the 2008 South by Southwest Film Festival. He directed and produced the 2010 documentary Fast Boy, about a young man's struggle with cancer.

Wine
In 2015, Cohen, Josh Ostrovsky, Tanner Cohen and Alexander Ferzan co-founded the company Swish Beverages, producer of several wines including White Girl Rosé and Babe Rosé With Bubbles.

Personal life
Cohen lives in Manhattan with his wife Cristi Andrews, an actress, and their two children.  Cohen's younger brother is actor and writer Tanner Cohen.

Bibliography
 White Girl Problems (Hyperion Books, January 31, 2012) - as Babe Walker
 Psychos: A White Girl Problems Book (Gallery Books, April 29, 2014) - as Babe Walker
 Dirty Rush (Gallery Books, January 13, 2015) - as Taylor Bell
 Money Pizza Respect (Grand Central Publishing, November 3, 2015) - with Josh Ostrovsky
 American Babe: A White Girl Problems Book (Gallery Books, June 28, 2016) - as Babe Walker
 Babe Walker: Thirsty (Pocket Star, May 29, 2017, e-book) - as Babe Walker

Filmography

Television

Film

References

External links
 
 Babe Walker website

Living people
1980 births
Writers from Annapolis, Maryland
Writers from New York City
Novelists from Washington, D.C.
Male actors from Maryland
Male actors from New York City
New York University alumni
American winemakers
Jewish American male actors
Jewish American novelists
Businesspeople from New York City
Novelists from New York (state)
Novelists from Maryland
21st-century American Jews